The Papyrus LXX Oxyrhynchus 3522, (signed as P.Oxy.L 3522: Rahlfs 857) – is a small fragment of the Greek Septuaginta (LXX) written in papyrus, in scroll form. As one of the manuscripts discovered at Oxyrhynchus it has been catalogued with the number 3522. Palaeographically it has been dated to the 1st century CE. The text agrees with the LXX.

Description 
P. J. Parson claim that its text "stands closer to the LXX rather than the literal accurate version of Symmachus the Ebionite. This fragment contains Job 42,11-12, including the tetragrammaton (written from right to left) in paleo-Hebrew.

The fragment was published in 1983 by P. J. Parsons in The Oxyrhynchus Papyri, vol. L (50).

Also the fragment is catalogued with number 857 in the list of manuscripts of the Septuagint as the classification of Alfred Rahlfs, also as LDAB 3079.

Text according to A. R. Meyer:
κ]αι εθαυμασαν οσα επ[ηγα
γε]ν ο 𐤉𐤄𐤅𐤄 επαυτον εδ[ωκε
δε ]αυτω εκαστος αμναδα μι
αν] και τετραχμον χρυσουν
α]σημον ο δε 𐤉𐤄𐤅𐤄 ευλογη
σ]εν τα εσχατα ϊωβ η τα [εμ
π]ροσθεν ην δε τα κτ[ηνη
αυτου προβα]τα μυρια[ τε 

Romanization of Meyer:
k]ai ethaumasan osa ep[ēga
ge]n ho 𐤉𐤄𐤅𐤄 epauton ed[ōke
de ]autō ekastos amnada mi
an] kai tetrachmon chrysoun
a]sēmon ho de 𐤉𐤄𐤅𐤄 eulogē
s]en ta eschata Ïōb hē ta [em
p]rosthen ēn de ta kt[ēnē
autou proba]ta myria[ te 

NIV translation:
They comforted and consoled him over all the
trouble the LORD had brought on him,
and each one gave him
a piece of silver and a gold ring.
The LORD blessed
the latter part of Job’s life
more than the former part.
He had [fourteen] thousand sheep…

Location 
The manuscript is kept in the Papyrology department of the Sackler library in Oxford as (P.Oxy.L 3522).

See also 

 Papyrus Fouad 266
 Papyrus LXX Oxyrhynchus 1007
 Papyrus LXX Oxyrhynchus 5101

References

Bibliography

External links 
 Picture of P. LXX Oxyrhynchus 3522

1st-century BC biblical manuscripts
3522
Book of Job
Septuagint manuscripts